The Dosti Music Project is an initiative of Found Sound Nation and the U.S. Embassy in Islamabad that began in 2014. The project brings together musicians from Pakistan, India and the United States for a month-long program to create and record music and then to showcase material on a short tour. Dosti translates to 'friendship' in both Urdu and Hindi, and represents the transcendence of political barriers that the program tries to promote through the musical collaboration.

References

Music festivals in Pakistan
Music festivals established in 2014
Rock festivals in Pakistan